Tyske Ludder is a German EBM band. Their members include Claus Albers, Olaf A. Reimers, Ralf Homann and Sebastian I. Hartmann. In 2008 they appeared at the Infest in Bradford. And in May 2009 they appeared at the Wave-Gotik-Treffen in Leipzig and the M'era Luna Festival in Hildesheim, Germany. The phrase Tyske Ludder directly translated means "German whores" in Danish and Norwegian and was used in those countries to describe a native woman that was romantically involved with a German soldier during World War II.

Gallery

Discography

Albums 
 1994: Bombt die Mörder? – KM-MUSIK
 1995: Dalmarnock – KM-MUSIK
 2006: Союз (Sojus) – Black Rain
 2006: Bombt die Mörder? – Re-Release with many remixes at Black Rain
 2006: Dalmarnock – Re-Release with many remixes at Black Rain
 2009: Anonymous - Black Rain
 2011: Diaspora - Black Rain
 2015: Evolution - Golden Core

EPs 
 1996: Creutzfeld E.P. – EP at KM-MUSIK
 2006: Creutzfeld E.P. – Re-Release of the EP with many remixes at Black Rain
 2008: SCIENTific technOLOGY E.P. - EP at Black Rain
 2013: Bambule E.P. – E.P. at Black Rain
 2019: Frohes Festung Europa - EP at 73SECBISMARCK
 2021: Ungewiss - EP at 73SECBISMARCK
 2021: Kaputt - EP at 73SECBISMARCK
 2022: Transformation - EP at 73SECBISMARCK

Remixes & Other appearances 
 2006: In Sedens – Remix for Grandchaos – God Is Dead (Tyske Ludder Remix) (3:49) – Deathkon Media
 2007: Methods To Madness – Remix for – Brain Leisure – Defect (Tyske Ludder Remix) (5:15) – Vendetta Music
 2007: When Angels Die – Remix for E-Craft – FunnyStuff & Violence (BrutallyComeFirstRmx) (4:06) – COP International
 2008: Blasphemous Radicals E.P. – Remix for Nurzery (Rhymes) – My Babylon (Tyske Ludder Remix) (3:51) – COP International

Compilations 
 Demo Compilation Vol. 3 (CD, Maxi) – A.I.D.S. – KM-Musik, Sounds Of Delight
 1993: Art & Dance 4 (CD) – Zu Viel, Barthalomäus – Gothic Arts Records / Lost Paradise
 1993: Take Off Music Volume 1 (CD) – Energie – KM-Musik
 1994: Demo Compilation Vol. 1 (CD, Maxi) – Wie Der Stahl Gehärtet – KM-Musik, Sounds Of Delight
 1995: An Ideal For Living 2 (CD, Ltd) – Blutrausch – Gothic Arts Records / Lost Paradise
 1998: Electrocity Level X (CD) – Monotonie (SutterCaine Remix) – Ausfahrt
 1999: Wellenreiter In Schwarz Vol. 3 (2 CD) – Grelle Farben – Credo, Nova Tekk
 2005: Bodybeats (CD) – Innenraum (Sutter Cain Remix) – COP International
 2006: Hymns Of Steel (CD) – Betrayal (Alloyed Steel Remix) – Machineries Of Joy
 2006: Interbreeding VIII: Elements Of Violence (2 CD) – Betrayal – (Wertstahl US...) BLC Productions
 2006: Orkus Compilation 16 (CD, Sampler, Enh) – Canossa – Orkus
 2007: A Compilation 2 (2 CD) – Canossa – Black Rain
 2007: Dark Visions 2 (DVD, PAL) – Canossa – Zillo
 2007: ElektroStat 2007 (CD) – Bionic Impression  Oslo Synthfestival
 2008: Zillo – New Signs & Sounds (CD) – Thetanen (Cruise-Up-Your-Ass-Edit by nurzery [rhymes]) – Zillo
 2008: A Compilation 3 (2 CD) – Thetanen – Black Rain
 2009: 12. Elektrisch Festival - Wie der Stahl gehärtet wurde (live),Khaled Aker (live) - Black A$
 2009: Extreme Lustlieder 3 (CD) - Bastard
 2009: Black Snow - Fairytale of the North - Black Rain

Further reading
DAF review, Osnabrueck, 2012 
metal.de review 
DAF review, Krefeld, 2009 
alternativmusik.de review 
interview

External links

 Official Website
 Tyske Ludder at Discogs
 Tyske Ludder at NME 
  Black Rain record label
  Tyske Ludder at Sideline Magazine, 18 September 2009 (archived link, 2 February 2013)

German electronic music groups
Electronic body music groups
Musical groups established in 1989
1989 establishments in Germany